Mountain Justice may refer to:

 Mountain Justice (1915 film), starring Lon Chaney, Sr.
 Mountain Justice (1930 film), directed by Harry Joe Brown
 Mountain Justice (1937 film), directed by Michael Curtiz
 Mountain Justice (organization) is an organization which demands justice for Appalachia